Sin Kakada (born 29 July 2000) is a Cambodian footballer who plays for Visakha in the Cambodian League and the Cambodia national team.

Club career
Kakada made his senior debut in Cambodia League in 2018 For Phnom Penh Crown.

International career
Kakada made his senior debut in a friendly match against Laos on 21 March 2018.

International goals

Cambodia U23

References

Living people
2000 births
Cambodian footballers
Cambodia international footballers
Association football midfielders
Phnom Penh Crown FC players
Sportspeople from Phnom Penh
Competitors at the 2019 Southeast Asian Games
Southeast Asian Games competitors for Cambodia
Visakha FC players
Cambodian Premier League players